"I Wanna Be Free" is a single by American country music artist Loretta Lynn. Released in February 1971, it was the first single from her album I Wanna Be Free. The song peaked at number 3 on the Billboard Hot Country Singles chart. It also reached number 1 on the RPM Country Tracks chart in Canada. She rerecorded "I Wanna Be Free" for her album Still Woman Enough (album), released on March 19, 2021. 

Lynn allowed PETA to use this song in a public service campaign to discourage the chaining of dogs outdoors in the cold.

Chart performance

References

1971 singles
Loretta Lynn songs
Songs written by Loretta Lynn
Song recordings produced by Owen Bradley
Decca Records singles
1971 songs